{{DISPLAYTITLE:C27H43NO8}}
The molecular formula C27H43NO8 (molar mass: 509.63 g/mol, exact mass: 509.2989 u) may refer to:

 Colforsin
 Veracevine